How to Seduce Difficult Women is a 2009 American romantic comedy film written, directed, and produced by Richard Temtchine. The film stars Louis-Do de Lencquesaing and Stéphanie Szostak. It revolves around a writer who decides to take on ten relationship-challenged men to help them learn the art of seduction.

Cast
 Louis-Do de Lencquesaing as Philippe
 Stéphanie Szostak as Gigi
 Gregg Bello as Dan
 Brian Avers as Mitchell
 Rachel Roberts as Sabrina
 Jonathan Hova as Mo
 David Wilson Barnes as Doug
 Esau Pritchett as David
 David Lee Russek as Tom
 Paul Lazar as Sam
 Adam LeFevre as Ira
 Jeff Skowron as Ronnie
 Bill Dawes as Al
 Jackie Hoffman as Book Publisher

Reception
On Rotten Tomatoes, How to Seduce Difficult Women holds an approval rating of 14% based on 7 reviews, with an average rating of 3.40 out of 10. Joseph Jon Lanthier of Slant Magazine rated the film 1 out of 4 stars, noting it "embodies the disturbingly "modern" sexual idealism that promises kinky rewards and cuddly concessions respectively to men and women bold enough to assert their selfishness in pursuit of "instinctual" posturing (men control, women swoon)." Aaron Hillis, writing for Time Out, gave the film 1 out of 5 stars.

References

External links
 
 

2009 films
2009 independent films
2009 romantic comedy films
2000s sex comedy films
2000s English-language films
American independent films
American romantic comedy films
American sex comedy films
Films about couples
Films set in New York City
Films shot in New York City
2000s American films